Events from the year 1625 in art.

Events
Abraham van der Doort becomes the first Surveyor of the King's Pictures to Charles I of England.

Works

Gian Lorenzo Bernini – Apollo and Daphne (marble)
Artemisia Gentileschi – Judith and Her Maidservant (Detroit Institute of Arts)
Gerard van Honthorst
The Matchmaker
Smiling Girl, a Courtesan, Holding an Obscene Image
Pieter Lastman – The Angel and Tobias with the Fish
Rembrandt
 The Senses (series)
 The Stoning of Saint Stephen
Jacopo Vignali – Cyparissus (approximate date)

Births
May 13 – Carlo Maratta, Italian painter (died 1713)
November 20 – Paulus Potter, Dutch painter specializing in animals in landscapes (died 1654)
date unknown
Antonio Busca, Italian painter active in Lombardy (died 1686)
Pietro Bellotti, Italian painter (died 1700)
Antonio Castrejon, Spanish painter (died 1690)
Federico Cervelli, Italian painter, born in Milan (died 1700)
Domenico Guidi, Italian sculptor (died 1701)
Abraham Hondius, Dutch Baroque  painter known for animal paintings (died 1691)
Giovan Battista Langetti, Italian painter (died 1676)
Cosimo Ulivelli, Italian who painted frescoes for the Santissima Annunziata church (died 1704)
probable
Hendrick Danckerts, Dutch painter and engraver (died 1680)
Charles Philippe Dieussart, Dutch architect and sculptor (died 1696)
Willem de Heusch, Dutch landscape painter (died 1692)
Justus de Verwer, Dutch painter and illustrator (died 1689)

Deaths
January 13 – Jan Brueghel the Elder, Flemish painter (born 1568)
April 23 - Juan de las Roelas, Spanish painter (born 1558)
November 16 - Sofonisba Anguissola, Italian painter (born 1532)
date unknown
Guglielmo Caccia, Italian painter specialising in altar-pieces (born 1568)
Bartolomeo Cavarozzi, Italian caravaggisti painter of the Baroque period active in Spain (born 1590)
Felipe de Liaño, Spanish painter
Renold Elstracke, one of the earliest native engravers in England (born 1570)
Antonio Mohedano, Spanish painter (born 1561)
Giulio Cesare Procaccini, Italian painter and sculptor of Milan (born 1574)
Hans Rottenhammer, German painter (born 1564)
Tommaso Salini, Italian painter of still life (born 1575)
Pieter de Valck, Dutch Golden Age painter (born 1584)

 
Years of the 17th century in art
1620s in art